Karel Ardelt (28 January 1889 – 14 February 1978) was a Czech tennis player.

As a player for Bohemia, he was entered in two events in tennis at the 1912 Summer Olympics: outdoor singles and outdoor doubles (with Jiří Kodl) but did not play.

Ardelt competed for Czechoslovakia in two events in tennis at the 1920 Summer Olympics:  singles and doubles (with Ladislav Žemla).

In the Davis Cup, he represented Czechoslovakia and lost five times.

References

Other sources

External links
 
 
 
 
 
 

1889 births
1978 deaths
Czechoslovak male tennis players
Olympic tennis players of Bohemia
Tennis players at the 1912 Summer Olympics
Olympic tennis players of Czechoslovakia
Tennis players at the 1920 Summer Olympics
Sportspeople from Písek